El-Moustafa Haddad (born 1940) is a Moroccan sailor. He competed in the Finn event at the 1960 Summer Olympics.

References

External links
 

1940 births
Living people
Moroccan male sailors (sport)
Olympic sailors of Morocco
Sailors at the 1960 Summer Olympics – Finn
People from El Jadida
20th-century Moroccan people